The 1979 Grand National (officially known as the Colt Car Grand National for sponsorship reasons) was the 133rd renewal of the Grand National horse race, which took place at Aintree near Liverpool, England, on 31 March 1979.

The race was won by Rubstic who was the first ever Scottish-trained winner.

Finishing order

Non-finishers 

Aftermath
Unfortunately, the Cheltenham Gold Cup winner Alverton broke his neck at Becher's on the second circuit and was euthanized.

Media coverage and aftermath

David Coleman once again presented a special edition of Grandstand on the BBC. The favourite, Alverton, died after falling at Becher's Brook on the second circuit (fence 22) when travelling strongly. Just over two weeks earlier he had won the Cheltenham Gold Cup and was going for a famous double only achieved by, Golden Miller, in 1934. Kintai was another fatality who was brought down at fence 15 and was later euthanized.

References

 1979
Grand National
Grand National
20th century in Merseyside
Grand National